Luciano Aued (born 1 March 1987) is an Argentine association football midfielder playing for Unión Santa Fe in the Primera División.

Career
He made the junior divisions in Gimnasia y Esgrima La Plata, where he arrived in 2001, and finally was promoted to participate in training of professional staff in 2007. He played 77 games in Gimnasia's first team without scoring goals from the 2007 Clausura until the 2011 Clausura.

After the Clausura 2011, with Gimnasia dropped a business group bought 50% of his passes and placed in Racing Club of Avellaneda. The December 14, 2014 is devoted champion Racing Club after 13 years of waiting.
Aued maintains a high level on the court being a midfielder of great quality. It would be with Ezequiel Videla integral double 5 which would help Racing Club to take the title in 2014 the Argentine tournament.

The September 17, 2015, playing against San Lorenzo by Quarterfinals of Copa Argentina, at 32 minutes after the break, scored Aued his first official goal in first division. He was held in the network Twitter as the #GolDeAued.

Career statistics

Club

International goals

Honours

Club
Racing Club
Argentine Primera División: 2014 Transición

Universidad Católica
 Primera División de Chile: 2018, 2019, 2020, 2021
 Supercopa de Chile: 2019, 2020, 2021

Individual
 Primera División's El Gráfico Golden Ball: 2018

References

1987 births
Living people
Argentine footballers
Argentine expatriate footballers
Jewish Argentine sportspeople
Club de Gimnasia y Esgrima La Plata footballers
Racing Club de Avellaneda footballers
Club Deportivo Universidad Católica footballers
Chilean Primera División players
Argentine Primera División players
Expatriate footballers in Chile
Association football midfielders
Footballers from La Plata